Swiss Family Robinson is a 1974–1975 Canadian television drama series, based on Johann David Wyss' 1812 novel The Swiss Family Robinson.

The series consisted of 26 30-minute episodes, and diverged somewhat from the original novel. Only one season was produced, due to the development of a Swiss Family Robinson series in 1975 by ABC in the United States. This situation precluded sales of the Canadian series to the lucrative American market. Reruns, however, continued to be syndicated in Canada for many years, with stations often scheduling the program as part of their Saturday morning line-up.

Cast
Diana Leblanc as Elizabeth Robinson (Mother)
Chris Wiggins as Johann Robinson (Father)
Michael Duhig as Ernest Robinson 
Ricky O'Neill as Franz Robinson
Heather Graham as Marie Robinson

Production
The series was produced by CTV, and Trident Television. Filming of beach scenes was conducted in Jamaica, while jungle scenes were filmed in Kleinburg, Ontario, Canada.

Characters
Johan Robinson – referred to mostly as father, by sons Ernest and Franz and papa by daughter Marie. A strong father figure, the children respect him. He in turn, is understanding, yet firm on the decisions he makes. Each episode begins and ends with a narration from a journal he was keeping.
Elizabeth Robinson – Mother to her 3 children, strong, like her husband, it was her idea to build the treehouse, She is compassionate, yet can be tough when the situation calls for it.
Ernest Robinson – oldest child, at 17, he helps his father protect the family. Ernest at times longs to be independent, can be over confident at times, which some times gets him into trouble, but otherwise, is protective, and cares very much for his younger brother and sister.
Franz Robinson – at 13 years old, Franz, is very intelligent, and very inquisitive. He was separated from his family during the storm that caused them to be marooned on the island, and after a few days found his family. Franz, at times feels competitive with older brother Ernest, and often wishes his family would let him have more grown up responsibilities.
Marie Robinson –  8 year old Marie is the only character not to appear in the original story. In this version, the Robinsons have a young daughter. Marie is known for finding dangerous animals, like wild boars, lions, snakes. Marie is also known for her sense of humor, although, whether or not her jokes are funny, is debatable. Her brothers have been known to run away from her jokes, which was a running theme on the show.

DVD release
The Swiss Family Robinson – The Complete Series was released on DVD by Morningstar Entertainment on 20 March 2007 in a 4-disc set. The DVDs are Region 1, NTSC format, digitally enhanced and colour-corrected. One special feature on the discs is a split-screen demonstration of the enhancement.

The DVD cover features a compass and a logo but not the one used on the TV series. There are a few cast-specific photos on the back.

The series received a second DVD release in 2009 (released this time by Image Entertainment) as a 3-disc set.

List of episodes
"The Arrival" – 10 January 1974
"Bruno" – 9 February 1801
"Dead Man's Gold" – 11 February 1801
"The Secret of Shark Island" – 4 March 1801
"Nature's Child" – 28 March 1801
"Return from Paradise" – 28 March 1801
"The Animal Kingdom" – 4 April 1801
"Disappearance" – 13 May 1801
"The Weakest Link" – 23 May 1801
"Somewhere on this Earth" – 11 June 1801
"Rogue" – 9 July 1801
"A Time to Live & A Time to Die" – 12 July 1801
"Skeleton Clue" – 1 August 1801
"Lost at Sea" – 4 August 1801
"Deadly Feast" – 11 August 1801
"The Visitor" – 13 August 1801
"Cave of the Tiger" – 19 August 1801
"Attack of the Cat" – 11 September 1801
"Curse of the Idol" – 11 September 1801
"The Intruder" – 22 September 1801
"Second Honeymoon" – 13 October 1801
"Monsoon" – 27 October 1801
"The Mark of Captain Keel" – 4 November 1801
"The Castaway" – 26 November 1801
"Rescue!" – 8 December 1801
"Terror on South Island" – 11 December 1801

References

External links

CTV Television Network original programming
1974 Canadian television series debuts
1975 Canadian television series endings
Television series about Christianity
The Swiss Family Robinson
English-language television shows
1970s Canadian drama television series
Television series by Fremantle (company)
Television series set on fictional islands